Miss Meadows is a 2014 American dark comedy thriller film written and directed by Karen Leigh Hopkins. The film stars Katie Holmes, James Badge Dale, Callan Mulvey and Stephen Bishop. The film was released on November 14, 2014, by Entertainment One Films.

Plot
Miss Mary Meadows is a young woman who works as a substitute first-grade elementary school teacher who enjoys taking long walks in her suburban neighborhood, wearing traditional clothing and tap-dancing shoes. Unknown to everyone, she is a secret vigilante who kills local thugs who accost her or when she witnesses them committing crimes. She always carries a small semi-automatic pistol in her purse and speaks in a childlike, innocent manner. She lives by herself in a small house and talks occasionally with her mother over the telephone about what she did during the day.

Investigating the vigilante killings is a local sheriff. He soon meets and develops an attraction to Miss Meadows due to her old-fashioned clothing and style of speech. When he begins to suspect that the woman he finds himself drawn to may be the suspect he is looking for, the sheriff is torn between whether to arrest or protect her.

When Miss Meadows meets an ex-convict named Skylar, who she learns served time for molesting young children, she begins to fear for her young students' safety. When Miss Meadows approaches and threatens to kill Skylar if he continues hanging around the school or around her kids, he begins stalking her.

It is eventually revealed that all of the telephone conversations that Miss Meadows has been having with her mother over the course of the film are imaginary. As a young girl, Mary Meadows witnessed her mother's murder in a drive-by shooting outside a local church after attending the wedding of a family friend. This traumatic incident left Miss Meadows so emotionally scarred that she entered a fantasy world in which she imagined that her mother was still alive, then began to go after and kill criminals whom she viewed as a threat to society.

The various criminals that Miss Meadows kills on-screen include a trucker who tries to abduct her at gunpoint in the opening scene, a young man who committed a mass shooting at a local diner, and the town's Catholic priest whom Miss Meadows finds sexually molesting a young boy.

When Miss Meadows learns that she is pregnant after a sexual encounter with the sheriff, she decides to accept his proposal of marriage. On the day of the wedding, Skylar kidnaps Heather, one of Miss Meadows's students, from her house, forcing Miss Meadows to go to Skylar's house (wearing her wedding dress) to try to stop him, only to end up a captive herself. When she manages to free Heather and struggle with Skylar over her gun, the sheriff, passing by after leaving the church, sees Heather running from Skylar's house as she shouts for help. Meanwhile, Skylar takes Miss Meadows' gun from her purse, aims it at her and asks, "Do you really think you can save the world? Well, try saving yourself first!" Just then, the sheriff arrives and fatally shoots Skylar in the head. Seeing Miss Meadows' gun still clutched in Skylar's hand, he notes "it has his prints now". He and Miss Meadows proceed back to the church.

One year later, Miss Meadows and the Sheriff are married; she still wears her tap shoes and he has taken up the accordion. Now parents to a baby daughter, they are content to be peculiar together. As Miss Meadows prepares to go out before dinner, the sheriff tells her "be careful"; she replies "I always am", leaves the house, and does one final little tap dance on the sidewalk.

Cast

Production
Principal photography and production began on August 6, 2013, in Cleveland, Ohio.

Release
The film premiered at the Tribeca Film Festival on April 21, 2014. The film was released on November 14, 2014, by Entertainment One Films.

Reception
Miss Meadows received negative reviews from critics. On Rotten Tomatoes, the film has a rating of 25%, based on 20 reviews, with an average rating of 4.62/10. On Metacritic, the film has a rating of 43 out of 100, based on 13 critics, indicating "mixed or average reviews".

References

External links
 

2014 films
2014 thriller films
American thriller films
Films shot in Cleveland
Fictional schoolteachers
2010s English-language films
2010s American films